Adrià Mateo López (born 16 March 1995), is a Spanish former footballer.

On 29 October 2021 he scored from 71 metres in a First Division match against Raufoss.

Career statistics

Club

References

1995 births
Living people
Spanish footballers
Association football midfielders
Levanger FK players
Ranheim Fotball players
Norwegian First Division players
Eliteserien players
Spanish expatriate footballers
Expatriate footballers in Norway
Spanish expatriate sportspeople in Norway